"I Believe (When I Fall in Love It Will Be Forever)" is a soul song co-written and performed by American singer-songwriter Stevie Wonder and Yvonne Wright, for Wonder's fifteenth studio album Talking Book (1972). The song is featured in the 2000 comedy-drama High Fidelity starring John Cusack and Jack Black, and is included on its soundtrack. It was also included in season 1 Episode 10 of the 2020 Hulu series High Fidelity starring Zoe Kravitz.

E'voke version

This song was also recorded by E'voke in 1994 as their debut single (with the title being shortened to "I Believe"). A B-side to the track entitled "It's My Life" written by E'voke producers Barry Leng and Duncan Hannant was recorded. Though the track was not a commercial hit (it reached #77 in the UK charts and no video was filmed for the track), it was a club hit and E'voke moved on to FFRR's sister label Ffrreedom for their next single "Runaway". The CD single release of the track was released digitally by Pinball Records in 2011.

Versions
 Edited version 4:03
 12" mix 5:38
 A Tin Tin Out mix 7:38
 Tall Paul mix 6:39
 The Gems for Jem mix 7:51
 "It's My Life" (B-side) 5:25

Other versions released as singles
In the spring of 1974, a recording by Songbird was released by Mushroom Records in Canada. This was a studio group consisting of producer Mike Flicker, Howard Leese and Rob Deans, all of whom also worked with Heart. It was the label's first charting single, reaching #75 on the Canadian chart. Despite its low peak, the single reportedly sold close to 30,000 units.

Colleen Hewett had an Australian single release of the song, entitled "I Believe When I Fall in Love", issued in July 1974. Hewett's rendition charted in Australia with a #51 peak, and was featured on Hewett's album M'Lady.

The song was the first track on the 1975 Art Garfunkel album Breakaway.  

Josh Groban recorded the song for his album All That Echoes, released in early 2013 and released it as a single that peaked at #20 on the Adult Contemporary chart.

George Michael released a live concert recording cover of the song and was released as a B-side to his duet with Elton John, Don't Let the Sun Go Down on Me and then was later released on the deluxe version of Faith in 2011. 

Father John Misty covered the song on his 2022 EP Live at Electric Lady.

References

1972 songs
1974 singles
Stevie Wonder songs
E'voke songs
Colleen Hewett songs
Songs written by Stevie Wonder
1994 debut singles
FFRR Records singles
Song recordings produced by Stevie Wonder